Justice is an American legal drama produced by Jerry Bruckheimer that aired on Fox in the US and CTV in Canada. The series also aired on Warner Channel in Latin America, in Brazil also was aired on Rede Globo, Nine Network in Australia, and on TV2 in New Zealand.

It first was broadcast on Wednesdays at 9:00 but, due to low ratings, it was rescheduled to Mondays at 9:00, in the hope viewers of the hit series Prison Break would stay tuned. On November 13, 2006, the show was put on hiatus, but two days later the network announced it was shifting it to Fridays at 8:00 to replace the canceled Vanished.

Fourteen episodes of the series were ordered, of which 13 episodes were produced. Twelve of the episodes of Justice have aired in the United States with the final episode airing in Mexico, the UK and Germany.

Premise
Justice is about a team of lawyers from different backgrounds who work at the  Los Angeles law firm of Trott, Nicholson, Tuller & Graves (TNT&G) and defend clients involved in controversial and newsworthy cases.  While criminal defense is most common, other cases may strike the interest of the firm such as wrongful death and other civil cases.  As the title implies, the viewer discovers whether or not "justice" has been served following the verdict, when what really transpired is revealed to the audience.

Cast and characters

Ron Trott
 Portrayed by Victor Garber
He is the head of TNT&G.  His overbearing personality and gleefully amoral approach to the practice of law make him exasperating to many—including juries—but he is a skilled, media-savvy lawyer who shares a good rapport and working relationship with his other TNT&G partners. He also has some degree of ethics despite his amorality; when he realizes that the woman he had once loved did indeed murder her son in cold blood he is legitimately heartbroken and is upset when he realizes they helped a guilty man escape justice.

He is the face seen on every media talk show in the country—and he wants it that way. He is great at landing a client, spinning a case and getting his way, but juries hate him. It was his inspiration and win-at-all-cost mentality that brought this group of brilliant, ego-driven attorneys together.

Tom Nicholson
 Portrayed by Kerr Smith
He is an idealistic trial lawyer. A native of a small Nebraska town, Hastings, he had a younger sister who died in her late teens.  He is only comfortable defending clients whom he believes to be innocent.  His youth and appealing demeanor as the all-American face of "not guilty" are cited by Ron as the reason that Tom (rather than Ron himself) should lead most trial representations. In spite of this, he did have some degree of prejudice against people who aren't quite "normal" (as seen in the episode Crucified); after this results in an innocent teenager getting convicted he becomes filled with guilt and wants to handle the appeal despite not being an appealate lawyer.

Tom is a brilliant litigator whose everyman, earnest manner makes him a Foil to Ron. Trials are won and lost on the art of battle in the courtroom, and Tom is a master of his domain. He has expressed interest in Alden.

Alden Tuller
 Portrayed by Rebecca Mader
She processes the physical evidence and hires experts for courtroom demonstrations. She frequently goes to Dr. Shaw for insight. Although she is unmarried, Alden wears a wedding ring in court in the belief that it helps jurors trust her. Unlike Tom, she prefers to believe that her firm's clients are guilty rather than innocent, so she won't be disappointed if they lose. In spite of this, she does have somewhat of a softer side for teenage clients, and is more willing to believe in their innocence (during the two episodes where the firm defends teenage clients Alden is in charge of preparing them for trial and looking after them.)

Luther Graves
 Portrayed by Eamonn Walker

Graves is a former prosecutor turned defense lawyer. A leader in the African-American political community, he is well-connected, politically motivated and in possession of an uncanny ability to take a step back and assess the merits of a case from both the prosecution's and the defense's perspective—anticipating the story each side will tell. His role at TNT&G frequently centers on predicting the moves of the prosecution (or the opposing party in civil suits). In "Prior Convictions" he is forced to defend a man he had previously convicted; over the course of the episode he learns that the man, Joshua Morton, had been convicted more because of his lawyer's incompetence and the jury's prejudice than anything Graves had done, and later is presented with proof that Joshua could not have committed the crime. He is fluent in Spanish, as seen in the show's last episode.

Recurring cast and characters
Katherine LaNasa as Suzanne Fulcrum, the host of a cable news program called American Crime.  Her coverage of the case in question is featured in several episodes.  Suzanne has something of a love/hate relationship with Trott.  While she likes the popularity of the cases tried by his firm, she despises his attempts to use her show to his advantage.
Aunjanue Ellis as Miranda Lee, a jury consultant frequently employed by TNT&G.  She possesses an uncanny insight into the mindset of potential jurors, and her input is often invaluable as the firm develops its legal strategies.
Mark Deklin as Dr. Matthew Shaw, a scientific expert hired by TNT&G to help with crime recreations.
Erin Daniels as Betsy Harrison, an ex-LAPD employee who worked with Luther back when he was a DA. She currently works as the firm's private investigator. Appears in "Addicts", "Crucified", and "Shotgun".
Will Owens as Paralegal Pete, a member of the legal team at TNT&G. Appears in "Pretty Woman," "Behind the Orange Curtain," and "Wrongful Death."
Paul Schulze as J.D. Keller, the District Attorney often is on the opposing side of cases tried by TNT&G. Appears in "Pretty Woman", "Crucified", and "Prior Conviction".
Dahlia Salem as Susan Hale, a District Attorney on the opposing side of a few cases tried by TNT&G. Appears in "Prior Conviction", "Shotgun", and "Christmas Party".

Episodes

References

External links
 

2000s American drama television series
2006 American television series debuts
2007 American television series endings
2000s American legal television series
English-language television shows
Fox Broadcasting Company original programming
Television series by Warner Bros. Television Studios
Television shows set in Los Angeles